Pterolophia multicarinata is a species of beetle in the family Cerambycidae. It was described by Stephan von Breuning in 1938. It is known from Tanzania, the Ivory Coast, the Central African Republic, Cameroon, and the Republic of the Congo.

References

multicarinata
Beetles described in 1938